

Harald Schultz (Latvian: Haralds Šulcs; 10 November 1895 – 15 March 1957) was a German general during World War II. He was a recipient of the Knight's Cross of the Iron Cross of Nazi Germany. Schultz surrendered to the Soviet forces in the Courland Pocket in 1945. Convicted as a war criminal in the Soviet Union, he was held until 1955.

Awards and decorations

 German Cross in Gold on 21 February 1944 as Oberst in Artillerie-Regiment 205
 Knight's Cross of the Iron Cross on 5 April 1945 as Generalmajor and commander of 24. Infanterie-Division

References

Citations

Bibliography

 
 

1895 births
1957 deaths
Military personnel from Riga
People from Kreis Riga
Baltic-German people
Major generals of the German Army (Wehrmacht)
Russian military personnel of World War I
20th-century Freikorps personnel
Latvian military personnel
Recipients of the Gold German Cross
Recipients of the Knight's Cross of the Iron Cross
German prisoners of war in World War II held by the Soviet Union